, long title "to amend Title 11 of the United States Code to treat Puerto Rico as a State for purposes of chapter 9 of such title relating to the adjustment of debts of municipalities," is a bill to amend section 101(52) of Title 11 of the United States Code, to define Puerto Rico as a state regarding Chapter 9 bankruptcy protections. Its short title is the "Puerto Rico Chapter 9 Uniformity Act of 2015" and it has been called "Super Chapter 9" in public debates. , the bill had gained 41 cosponsors.

See also
List of bills in the 114th United States Congress

References

External links
All Bill Information (Except Text) for H.R.870 - Puerto Rico Chapter 9 Uniformity Act of 2015

Proposed legislation of the 114th United States Congress